The fourth season of Bachelor in Paradise premiered on August 14, 2017. Chris Harrison reprises his role from The Bachelor and The Bachelorette as the host of the show.

Production
As with the previous season, filming took place in the town of Sayulita, located in Vallarta-Nayarit, Mexico.

Misconduct allegations
On June 11, 2017, production was suspended indefinitely due to alleged misconduct. It was reported that production allegedly filmed cast member DeMario Jackson in a sexual encounter with Corinne Olympios, who may have been too drunk to consent. Warner Bros. released a statement saying:

On June 20, 2017, it was announced that Warner Bros. has cleared the show and its producers of any misconduct as they found no evidence of misconduct. It was also confirmed that filming will resume.  Warner Bros. released a statement saying:

While neither Corinne Olympios nor DeMario Jackson returned to filming post-scandal, they still appeared in this season from footage shot before the scandal halted production, and appeared separately and together in live studio interviews with host Chris Harrison.  Olympios told Harrison that she drank while taking a medication that is not supposed to be mixed with alcohol, causing her to become "imbalanced" and "mentally checked out," but with "no way" for anyone around her to know that was the case.

Casting
During After the Final Rose, Nick Viall's runner-up, Raven Gates, accepted an offer to join this season.  Some of the cast was announced on June 6, 2017.  After Dean Unglert was eliminated during hometown week, it was announced that he would be joining the season 4 cast in Paradise.

Wells Adams of season twelve of The Bachelorette became the show's new bartender replacing Jorge Moreno.

Contestants

Elimination table

Key
 The contestant is male.
 The contestant is female.
 The contestant went on a date and gave out a rose at the rose ceremony.
 The contestant went on a date and got a rose at the rose ceremony.
 The contestant gave or received a rose at the rose ceremony, thus remaining in the competition.
 The contestant received the last rose.
 The contestant went on a date and received the last rose.
 The contestant went on a date and was eliminated.
 The contestant was eliminated. 
 The contestant was not allowed to return to Paradise when filming resumed.
 The contestant had a date and voluntarily left the show.
 The contestant voluntarily left the show.
 The contestant left paradise before the shutdown, but came back when filming resumed and gave out a rose.
 The couple broke up and were eliminated.
 The contestant split after Bachelor in Paradise ended.
 The couple decided to stay together and won the competition.
 The contestant had to wait before appearing in paradise

Episodes

Notes

References

External links
 
 Information about Riviera Nayarit

Paradise 04
2017 American television seasons
Television shows set in Mexico